Thinktank, Birmingham   (formerly known as simply Thinktank) is a science museum in Birmingham, England. Opened in 2001, it is part of Birmingham Museums Trust and is located within the Millennium Point complex on Curzon Street, Digbeth.

History

The Birmingham Collection of Science & Industry was started in the mid-19th century, initially consisting of collections of weapons from the gun trade and the Birmingham Proof House. The Birmingham Museum & Art Gallery opened in 1885, including science collections. In 1951 the Museum of Science and Industry opened at Elkington Silver Electroplating Works, Newhall Street. Over the following years, the museum acquired individual artefacts, as well as entire collections, that were related to local industry and the history of science and technology.

Birmingham City Council decided in 1995 to relocate the museum when it was given an opportunity by the Millennium Commission to construct a new building. The former museum closed in 1997, and Thinktank opened on 29 September 2001 as part of the £114-million Millennium Point complex. It was funded by Birmingham City Council, supported by the Millennium Commission. The area adjacent to the building is designated Eastside City Park. While many objects were put on display at Thinktank, others were stored at the Birmingham Museum Collection Centre, and some were brought out of storage.

Although the previous science museum was free to enter, Thinktank charges an entrance fee. In 2005 the museum underwent a £2 million upgrade, including the installation of a planetarium. By 2007 it had received over 1 million visitors. In April 2012, Birmingham Museums Trust took over governance and management responsibility for Thinktank, along with eight other sites.

In March 2015, a new "Spitfire gallery" opened, relating the displayed aircraft to their production, locally. Among the new exhibits are a leather flying helmet previously belonging to Helen Kerly, one of only two British civilian women commended for flying during the Second World War.

Collections

Aircraft

Locomotives

Trams

Cars

Stationary steam engines
Thinktank, Birmingham Science Museum has a big collection of stationary steam engines. The following are some examples of them:

Other machines

Displays 
Thinktank has four floors of over 200 hands-on exhibits and artefacts. Each floor has a theme, in general going from the past, in The Past (Level 0), through The Balcony (Level 1) and The Present (Level 2), to the future, in The Future gallery (Level 3). It has lost its theme as new items have been added.

Surroundings 
The museum shares the Millennium Point building with Birmingham City University, and is situated in the Eastside district. It lies near Aston University and the Gun Quarter – which was for many years the centre of world's gun-manufacturing industry. Immediately opposite are The Woodman, a public house, and Curzon Street railway station - both listed buildings.

References

External links

 

Museums in Birmingham, West Midlands
Planetaria in the United Kingdom
Railway museums in England
Industry museums in England
Steam museums in England
Local museums in the West Midlands (county)
Transport museums in England
Technology museums in the United Kingdom
Science museums in England
Articles containing video clips
Industry in Birmingham, West Midlands
Birmingham Museums Trust